Litta may refer to:
 Litta (family)

People 
 Alfonso Litta (1608–1679), Cardinal and Archbishop of Milan from 1652 to 1679
 Lorenzo Litta (1756–1820), Italian littérateur and churchman, who became a cardinal
 Paolo Litta (1871-1931), Italian composer

Places 
 Casale Litta, Varese, Italy
 Orio Litta, Lodi, Italy

Other 
 Palazzo Litta, Milan
 Madonna Litta

See also

Lotta (disambiguation)